The Diocese of Hong Kong Island is one of the three dioceses under the Hong Kong Sheng Kung Hui, a province of the Anglican Communion. Its territory covers Hong Kong Island and the outlying islands. The cathedral of the diocese, St. John's Cathedral, is the oldest surviving Western ecclesiastical building in Hong Kong. It was constructed in the 1840s.

The incumbent Bishop of Hong Kong Island, Matthias Der, was consecrated as bishop on 3 October 2020 and enthroned on 2 January 2021. Der succeeded Paul Kwong as bishop of the diocese, who served concurrently as Archbishop and Primate of Hong Kong.

Churches 
The diocese oversees over 16 churches and chapels across Hong Kong Island and the outlying islands of Hong Kong.

Parishes 
 St. John's Cathedral, Central
 St. Stephen's Church, Sai Wan
 Holy Nativity Church, Shau Kei Wan
 St. Peter's Church, North Point
 St. Mary's Church, Causeway Bay
 St. James' Church, Wan Chai
 St. Paul's Church, Mid-Levels
 St. Matthew's Church, Sheung Wan
 St. Luke's Church, Kennedy Town
 St. Timothy's Church, Pok Fu Lam

Missions 
 Grace Church, Stanley
 Church of the Incarnation, Discovery Bay
 Church of the Ascension, Tung Chung
 Discovery Bay Church
 St. Stephen's Chapel (located in St. Stephen's College), Stanley
 Emmanuel Church (located in George C. Tso Memorial Chapel of the defunct Béthanie Sanatorium), Pok Fu Lam

Bishops 
 The Most Reverend Peter KWONG Kong-kit (1998-2007)
 The Most Reverend Paul KWONG (2007-2021)
 The Right Reverend Matthias Clement Tze-wo DER (2021-now)

Gallery

References

External links 
 Diocese of Hong Kong Island 
 Hong Kong Sheng Kung Hui

Anglican Diocese of Hong Kong Island
Hong Kong Sheng Kung Hui
Hong Kong Island